Lennox International Inc. is a provider of climate control products for the heating, ventilation, air conditioning, (in the complex colloquially called: HVAC) and refrigeration markets.  The company is based outside Dallas, Texas in the United States and has operations globally.

History 
The company was founded in 1895, in Marshalltown, Iowa, by Dave Lennox, the owner of a machine repair business for railroads. Inventors Ezra William Smith and Ernest Bryant brought their idea for a riveted steel coal-fired furnace to his machine shop to build parts for a prototype. In lieu of payment, Lennox accepted their patent, obtaining rights to the idea. He founded the Lennox Furnace Co. improving the design that led to numerous advancements in heating, cooling and climate control solutions.  The company was sold in 1904 to DW Norris who managed the company until his death in 1949, following which ownership devolved to his descendants who continued to hold a prominent position in the company in the following decades.

From 1964-65, Lennox dabbled in the lawn and garden industry by building a small crawler tractor and mower called the Lennox Kitty Track 600. It featured a  Briggs & Stratton engine and a 32" mower deck.  
 
In 1971 the small, nonprofitable (low pressure) gas cylinder business of Lennox Industries was sold to Worthington Industries, marking its first diversification step.

In 1973, Lennox purchased the commercial refrigeration products firm Heatcraft, including the Larkin, Bohn, Chandler, and Climate Control brands.  In 2010, the Kysor/Warren brand was added under the Heatcraft umbrella.

Air conditioning
Lennox has three different series of air conditioners, Elite, Dave Lennox Signature Collection and Merit series.

Brands
Besides the namesake Lennox brand, the company sells a number of brands under its Allied Air subsidiary, including the following:

Concord
Ducane
Allied
AirEase
Armstrong Air
Magic-Pak
Advanced Distributor Products (ADP)
Heatcraft

Plant locations

Marshalltown, Iowa, USA - Main plant that manufactures furnaces, heat pumps, and air conditioners
Orangeburg, South Carolina, USA - Allied Air products including furnaces, heat pumps, and air conditioners
Grenada, Mississippi, USA - Coils and air handlers
Ramos Arizpe, Coahuila, Mexico - Merit series Lennox products and many Allied Air models

Former locations
Columbus, Ohio - Air conditioners; closed in 1994
Bellevue, Ohio - Main Armstrong plant; closed in 2008

References

External links
 

Companies listed on the New York Stock Exchange
Electronics companies established in 1895
Companies based in Richardson, Texas
Heating, ventilation, and air conditioning companies
American companies established in 1895
1895 establishments in Iowa